Life Is Elsewhere is a Czech-language novel by Milan Kundera finished in 1969. It was first published in French in 1973.

The setting for Life Is Elsewhere is Czechoslovakia before, during, and after the Second World War, and tells the story of Jaromil, a character who dedicates his life to poetry.

1969 Czech novels
Novels by Milan Kundera
Alfred A. Knopf books
Novels set in Czechoslovakia
20th-century Czech novels